Billy James Pettis (1913 – 14 April 1979), was an American mathematician, known for his contributions to functional analysis.

See also
Dunford–Pettis property
Dunford–Pettis theorem
Milman–Pettis theorem
Orlicz–Pettis theorem
Pettis integral
Pettis theorem

References
Graves, William H.; Davis, Robert L.; Wright, Fred B., Introduction. In: Proceedings of the Conference on Integration, Topology, and Geometry in Linear Spaces (Univ. North Carolina, Chapel Hill, N.C., 1979), pp. vii—ix, Contemporary Mathematics 2, Amer. Math. Soc., Providence, R.I., 1980.  (This is an introduction to the collection of papers dedicated to the memory of B. J. Pettis.)

External links

A Guide to the B. J. Pettis Papers, 1938-1980

1979 deaths
20th-century American mathematicians
1913 births
Functional analysts